Austral Líneas Aéreas Flight 2553 was an Argentinian domestic scheduled Posadas–Buenos Aires service operated with a McDonnell Douglas DC-9-32 that crashed on the lands of Estancia Magallanes, Nuevo Berlín,  away from Fray Bentos, Uruguay, on 10 October 1997. All 74 passengers and crew died upon impact. The accident remains the deadliest in Uruguayan history.

Aircraft and crew 
The aircraft involved in the accident was a McDonnell Douglas DC-9-32, registration LV-WEG. It had its maiden flight in 1969, and was 28 years old at the time of the accident. It had previously operated for Iberia with registration EC-BQT, and it was transferred to the airline in 1993 after the buyout of the company by the Spanish carrier.

The captain was 40-year-old Jorge Cécere, who had been with the airline since 1989 and logged 9,238 hours, including 223 hours on the DC-9. The first officer was Horacio Núñez, who was also 40. He had been with the airline since 1993 and had 2,910 flight hours. He was more experienced on the DC-9 than captain Cécere, with 1,384 hours on that aircraft.

Accident 

The aircraft, which left from Posadas and was due to land in Aeroparque Jorge Newbery, Buenos Aires, was forced to divert towards Fray Bentos to avoid a storm. Examination of the aircraft's flight data recorder (FDR) revealed that shortly after the diversion occurred, the aircraft airspeed indicator began to fall to an alarmingly low indicated airspeed. Unknown to the pilots, this was caused not directly, by a loss of power, but by ice formed inside the pitot tube, which reads the airspeed for the indicator by measuring the pressure of inflow air. The ice obstructing the pitot tube reduced the air inflow, thus giving an erroneously low indicated airspeed.

In response to what they interpreted as a loss of engine power, the pilots gradually increased power from the engines in order to maintain airspeed; seeing no improvement, they contacted the control tower in Ezeiza Airport and requested clearance to descend to a lower altitude. After receiving no response, the Captain decided to descend to a lower altitude to increase speed even with no clearance received from the Air Traffic Control. However, the First Officer disregarded the Captain's commands and deployed the wings' slats to maintain their altitude and lower the plane's stall speed. Consequently, at this point the airplane was actually flying at a higher speed than normal; it was descending, which further increased airspeed to a point dangerously near to VNE, the "never exceed speed", above which structural damage to the aircraft might occur.

With the slats extended at a speed beyond their operational limits, one of them was torn from the aircraft, causing catastrophic asymmetry in the airflow over the wings. The aircraft immediately became uncontrollable and crashed.

Compounding this problem was the absence of the alarm designed to report such a malfunction (raising serious questions about inspection irregularities by the Argentine Air Force).

See also 
Air Force, Incorporated (Fuerza Aérea Sociedad Anónima), a film by former pilot Enrique Piñeyro that attempts to explain the major causes of the crash
West Air Sweden Flight 294 and Copa Flight 201, both accidents where pilots reacted improperly to instrument malfunctions.

References

External links
 
 "Boletín Informativo Nº 29." (Archive) Junta de Investigaciones de Accidentes de Aviación Civil 

Aviation accidents and incidents in Uruguay
Accidents and incidents involving the McDonnell Douglas DC-9
Aviation accidents and incidents in 1997
Aviation accidents and incidents in Argentina
1997 in Argentina
Airliner accidents and incidents caused by instrument failure
1997 in Uruguay
Aerolíneas Argentinas
October 1997 events in South America
1997 disasters in Uruguay